Peter Wirtz Callahan (born June 1, 1991) is a Belgian-American middle-distance runner who competed for Belgium at the 2016 European Athletics Championships. In the course of his collegiate career, he first studied and ran at Princeton University before going to University of New Mexico.

Running career

High school
Callahan attended and ran at North Shore Country Day School, where he was coached by Patrick McHugh. By the time he graduated in the summer of 2009, he recorded personal bests of 1:51.22 in the 800 meters and 4:05.20 in the mile.

Callahan won three Illinois High School Association 1A state titles in (2008 - 4:20.52, 2009 - 4:15.30) 1600 meters. and (2009 - 1:51.22) 800 meters.

Collegiate
Callahan first attended and ran at Princeton University, where he graduated in 2013. While at Princeton, he was coached by Steve Dolan and set the school record in the indoor 1,000 meters at 2:20.78.

Callahan earned 7 Ivy League titles, 1 NCAA Division I Indoor Track title as a part of the Distance Medley team and 1 All-America at Princeton University.

Due to skipping two seasons from multiple injuries, he got fifth year NCAA eligibility when he enrolled in a graduate program at University of New Mexico.

While at University of New Mexico, Callahan placed fourth in the NCAA outdoor men's 1500 meters finals for two consecutive years, in 2014 and 2015. Callahan earned a Mountain West Conference Outdoor Track 1500 meter title.

Callahan finished a graduate degree in Master of Science in Geography (Concentration in Environmental Studies) from University of New Mexico.

Post-collegiate
Callahan made an appearance as a professional rabbit in the 2015 Diamond League men's 3000 meters. In May 2016, the IAAF approved Callahan to represent Belgium in international competition. He was eligible to represent Belgium due to his mother having been born in Antwerp.

The approval happened amidst a race campaign in hopes of qualifying for the 2016 Summer Olympics. His first international competition after his IAAF-mandated switch was the 2016 European Athletics Championships, where he raced in the men's 1500 meters in a time of 3:41.75. He did not progress into the finals. He did not qualify for the Olympics in 2016, having not satisfied the 3:36.19 Olympic "A" standard for the men's 1500 meters. His closest result was at the 2016 Swarthmore Final Qualifier, where he ran the 1500 in 3:37.87, placing seventh. On July 22, 2016, Callahan raced in the men's mile at the 2016 Morton Games in Dublin, Ireland, where he finished in 3:56.14 for fourth place.

Callahan placed first at 2017 European Team Championships in the 1500 meters.

Callahan placed fourth in the 1500 meters in 3:54.71 at the 2018 Belgium Athletics Championship on July 8.

Callahan placed eighth in the first heat (30th overall) at 2018 European Athletics Championships in the 1500 meters.

Coaching
Northwestern University has added four-time All-American Peter Callahan as a women's cross country coach under head coach 'A Havahla Haynes February 2018. Callahan, the Evanston native attended North Shore Country Day School in Winnetka, Illinois.

References

1991 births
Living people
American male middle-distance runners
Belgian male middle-distance runners
New Mexico Lobos men's track and field athletes
Princeton Tigers men's track and field athletes
Sportspeople from Illinois
Sportspeople from Evanston, Illinois
People from Evanston, Illinois
Track and field athletes from Illinois